Tutbury and Hatton Station is a railway station in England, served by trains on the Crewe to Derby Line, which is a Community rail line known as the North Staffordshire line. The station is owned by Network Rail and managed by East Midlands Railway.

History
The original station, called simply Tutbury, was opened on 11 September 1848 by the North Staffordshire Railway. Nestlé have a historical presence in the village of Hatton due to the surrounding farmland, which supported a strong dairy farming industry. Nestlé's factory is labelled by the company as their Tutbury factory. Until the late 1970s the factory had its own private siding, which gave access to milk trains from the station. The factory since has developed into a major coffee producer, the sole UK facility producing the Dolce Gusto range, and also NescaféNESCAFÉ Dolce Gusto

The original Tutbury station closed to passengers on 7 November 1966.

The present station was opened in 1989 and serves the villages of Tutbury in Staffordshire, and Hatton in Derbyshire.

Facilities  
The station is formed of two platforms which are staggered either side of the level crossing, supervised by a signal box at the station.

The station is unstaffed and facilities are limited. The station has a shelter on each platform as well modern help points and bicycle storage. The station has no ticket machines and the full range of tickets can be purchased from the guard on board the train.

Step-free access is available to both the platforms at the station.

Services
All services at Tutbury and Hatton are operated by East Midlands Railway.

During the late evenings, services terminate at Nottingham instead of Newark Castle.

On Sundays, the station is served by an hourly service between Crewe and Derby only although no trains operate before 14:00.

References

Further reading

External links

www.burton-on-trent.org.uk/station-history 

Page at Dudley Mall

Railway stations in Derbyshire
DfT Category F2 stations
Former North Staffordshire Railway stations
1848 establishments in England
Railway stations in Great Britain opened in 1848
Railway stations in Great Britain closed in 1966
Railway stations in Great Britain opened in 1989
Reopened railway stations in Great Britain
Railway stations served by East Midlands Railway